The Copa del Generalísimo 1945 Final was the 43rd final of the King's Cup. The final was played at Montjuïc in Barcelona, on 24 June 1945, being won by Club Atlético de Bilbao, who beat Valencia CF 3-2.

Details

References

1945
Copa
Athletic Bilbao matches
Valencia CF matches